Syam may refer to:
 Syam, Jura, a commune in eastern France
 Syam Ben Youssef, Tunisian footballer
 Amal Syam, member of the Palestinian group Hamas
 Satrio Syam, Indonesian footballer
 Variant of the Indian given name Shyam (see article for a list of people)

See also 
 Sjam (disambiguation)
 Siam (disambiguation)
 Château de Syam, a castle in Syam, Jura, France
 Forges de Syam, forge works in Jura département
 Seyam, a list of people with that name